Robert Roest (born 30 October 1969) is a Dutch footballer who played as a defender for FC Utrecht, KSK Beveren, Fortuna Sittard and AGOVV Apeldoorn.

External links
 

1969 births
Living people
Dutch footballers
FC Utrecht players
Fortuna Sittard players
AGOVV Apeldoorn players
People from Soest, Netherlands
Association football defenders
Footballers from Utrecht (province)
FC Utrecht non-playing staff
K.S.K. Beveren players
Expatriate footballers in Belgium
Dutch expatriate footballers
Dutch expatriate sportspeople in Belgium
21st-century Dutch people